Christmas Dreams is an album by American singer-songwriter Don McLean, released in 1997.

Track listing
"The Christmas Song (Chestnuts Roasting on an Open Fire)" (Mel Tormé, Robert Wells) – 3:39
"Oh Holy Night" – 4:20
"I Heard the Bells on Christmas Day" (Henry Wadsworth Longfellow) – 3:16
"Blue Christmas" (Bill Hayes, Jay Johnson) – 3:52
"Christmas Waltz" (Sammy Cahn, Jule Styne) – 3:06
"Let It Snow! Let It Snow! Let It Snow!" (Sammy Cahn, Jule Styne) – 2:36
"Toyland" (Victor Herbert, Glen MacDonough) – 3:33
"On the Last Month of the Year" – 4:20
"It Came Upon a Midnight Clear" (Edmund Hamilton Sears, Richard Storrs Willis) – 3:23
"Silent Night" (Franz Xaver Gruber, Joseph Mohr) – 4:08

Personnel
Don McLean - vocals, guitar, arrangements
Brent Mason - guitar
Gary Lunn - bass
Jim Ferguson - bass
Tony Migliore - piano, string arrangements, synthesizer banjo
Terry McMillan - percussion
Dennis Solee - saxophone
Nashville String Machine - string ensemble
Bruce Resnikoff - Executive Producer

References

Don McLean albums
1997 Christmas albums
Christmas albums by American artists
Folk rock Christmas albums
Hip-O Records albums